Encryphodes aenictopa is a species of snout moth. It was described by Alfred Jefferis Turner in 1913 and is found in Australia.

References

Phycitini
Moths described in 1913